Athletics at the 2013 Games of the Small States of Europe was held from 28 May to 1 June at the Stade Josy Barthel.

The men's 100 metres champion, Christos Chatziangelidis of Cyprus, gave a positive doping test during the competition, meaning the disqualification of his 100 m title, a 200 m silver medal, and also the 4×100 m relay title on by Cyprus.

Medal summary

Men

Women

Medal table

Participating countries

 (7)
 (39)
 (18)
 (3)
 (36) (host team)
 (15)
 (15)
 (3)
 (13)

Men's results

100 metres

Heats – May 28Wind:Heat 1: -2.7 m/s, Heat 2: -0.2 m/s

Final – May 28Wind:0.0 m/s

200 metres

Heats – May 30Wind:Heat 1: +1.8 m/s, Heat 2: +1.5 m/s

Final – June 1Wind:+2.9 m/s

400 metres

Heats – May 28

Final – May 30

800 metres
May 28

1500 metres
May 30

5000 metres
May 28

10,000 metres
June 1

110 metres hurdles
May 30Wind: 0.0 m/s

400 metres hurdles
May 30

3000 metres steeplechase
May 30

4 x 100 meters relay
June 1

4 x 400 meters relay
June 1

High jump
June 1

Pole vault
May 28

Long jump
May 30

Triple jump
June 1

Shot put
May 28

Discus throw
May 30

Javelin throw
June 1

Women's results

100 metres

Heats – May 28Wind:Heat 1: -0.3 m/s, Heat 2: +0.5 m/s

Final – May 28Wind:0.0 m/s

200 metres

Heats – May 30Wind:Heat 1: +1.0 m/s, Heat 2: +0.5 m/s

Final – June 1Wind:0.0 m/s

400 metres

Heats – May 28

Final – May 30

800 metres
May 28

1500 metres
May 30

5000 metres
June 1

10,000 metres
May 28

100 metres hurdles
May 30Wind: 0.0 m/s

400 metres hurdles
May 30

4 x 100 meters relay
June 1

4 x 400 meters relay
June 1

High jump
May 30

Pole vault
May 30

Long jump
May 28

Triple jump
June 1

Shot put
June 1

Javelin throw
May 28

References

External links
Site of the 2013 Games of the Small States of Europe
Result book

Games of the Small States of Europe
Athletics
2013
2013 Games of the Small States of Europe